Pekka Kainu (born 20 December 1979) is a Finnish footballer.

References
Guardian Football

Finnish footballers
Veikkausliiga players
1979 births
Living people
Vaasan Palloseura players
Kokkolan Palloveikot players
TP-47 players
Association football forwards
GBK Kokkola players